This is a list of stars which are the least voluminous known (the smallest stars by volume).

List

Notable small stars
This is a list of small stars that are notable for characteristics that are not separately listed.

Smallest stars by type

Timeline of smallest red dwarf star recordholders
Red dwarfs are considered the smallest star known that are active fusion stars, and are the smallest stars possible that is not a brown dwarf.

Notes

References 

Volume, least